Hypolaena fastigiata, commonly known as tassel rope-rush, is a plant species in the family Restionaceae. It is endemic to Australia.

References

Flora of the Australian Capital Territory
Flora of New South Wales
Flora of Queensland
Flora of South Australia
Flora of Tasmania
Flora of Victoria (Australia)
Angiosperms of Western Australia
Restionaceae
Plants described in 1810
Taxa named by Robert Brown (botanist, born 1773)